Samuel Gary Igoe (born 30 September 1975) is an English former professional footballer who played as a midfielder during his career.

Career
He started his career with Portsmouth, and after spells with Reading, Luton Town and Swindon Town. Igoe signed for Millwall in August 2005 but he struggled to maintain a first team place after Steve Claridge was sacked as manager.

Igoe impressed Bristol Rovers manager Paul Trollope during a loan spell at the club at the end of the 2005–06 season, and in the summer of 2006 he signed for the club on a permanent basis.

The next season, he became a regular in midfield. The highlight of the season came right at the end, he scored the last goal in the play-off final, in the 3–1 win against Shrewsbury Town at Wembley Stadium, on 26 May, running 60 yards to score it into an empty net, after the Shrewsbury goalkeeper had gone to the other goal to try to score an equaliser.

Igoe was given a loan spell at Hereford United, joining on 27 March 2008. When he returned from his loan spell at the end of the 2007–08 season he was released from his contract with Bristol Rovers, along with Chris Carruthers.

Igoe then signed a one-year contract with AFC Bournemouth after impressing whilst on trial.

On 10 May 2010, Igoe was released from Bournemouth having not being offered a new contract. On 30 June, he signed a one-year contract with Havant & Waterlooville with an option for another year.

In July 2012, having made 65 appearances for Havant & Waterlooville and scored 5 goals, Igoe signed for newly promoted Southern League Premier Division side Gosport Borough.

On 27 March 2014, it was announced that Igoe had joined Isthmian League Premier Division side Bognor Regis Town on loan.

Honours
Bristol Rovers
Football League Trophy runner up 2007
Football League Two play-off winner 2007
Gosport Borough
Southern League Premier Division play-off winner 2013

References

External links

1975 births
People from Staines-upon-Thames
Living people
Association football midfielders
English footballers
Portsmouth F.C. players
Reading F.C. players
Millwall F.C. players
Luton Town F.C. players
Swindon Town F.C. players
Bristol Rovers F.C. players
Hereford United F.C. players
AFC Bournemouth players
Havant & Waterlooville F.C. players
Gosport Borough F.C. players
Bognor Regis Town F.C. players
English Football League players